Gostenhof station is a Nuremberg U-Bahn train station, in Nuremberg, Germany.  It is located on the U1 line.

References

Nuremberg U-Bahn stations
Railway stations in Germany opened in 1980
1980 establishments in West Germany